Jailene Cintrón, on recordings credited as Jailene (born 28 May 1966 in Río Piedras, Puerto Rico) is a Puerto Rican merengue singer and recording artist, as well as a TV personality and entertainer.

She was the female co-host of the talk and variety show No te Duermas from 1991 to 1996. She is currently one of the co-hosts of Pégate al Mediodía.

Her 1999 album Encontré el amor was among the four works nominated for the 2000 Grammy Award for Best Merengue Album.

Personal life

Cintrón married businessman José Juan Arce in the late 90s. The couple has two daughters together.

Awards

Lo Nuestro Awards
The Lo Nuestro Awards are awarded annually by television network Univision in the United States. Cintrón has received one award from four nominations.

|-
|rowspan="2" scope="row"| 1996
|scope="row"| "Herself"
|scope="row"| Tropical Salsa New Artist
| 
|-
|scope="row"| "Herself"
|scope="row"| Tropical Salsa Female Artist
| 
|-
|rowspan="1" scope="row"| 1997
|scope="row"| "Herself"
|scope="row"| Tropical Salsa Female Artist
| 
|-
|rowspan="1" scope="row"| 1998
|scope="row"| "Herself"
|scope="row"| Tropical Salsa Female Artist
| 
|-

Discography 
 1995: Jailene, EMI Latin
 1996: Como Toda Mujer, EMI Latin
 1996: Es Navidad, EMI Latin
 1997: Aquí Estoy, EMI Latin
 1998: Encontré el Amor, EMI Latin
 2005: Sólo Por Ti

See also

List of Puerto Ricans

References 

1966 births
Living people
Grammy Award winners
Merengue musicians
People from Río Piedras, Puerto Rico
Puerto Rican expatriates in Spain
Puerto Rican television personalities
20th-century Puerto Rican women singers
21st-century Puerto Rican women singers
Women in Latin music